Amphitrite was launched in 1796 at Kingston upon Hull. She first appeared in Lloyd's Register (LR) in 1797 with S.Barker, master, Atkinson, owner, and trade Hull–Lisbon.  Lloyd's Register does not show any change of ownership or master in 1800, or after. However, the Register of Shipping for 1800 showed her with Adams, master, Forbes, owner, and trade Liverpool–Africa. By another account Amphitute, of 194 tons (bm), George Adams, master, William Forbes & Co., sailed from Liverpool on 17 June 1799 for the Gold Coast, where she intended to acquire 323 captives. Captain George Adams sailed from Liverpool on 21 July 1799.

Lloyd's List reported on 4 February 1800 that "The French Squadron" had captured Adriana, Hewitt, master, and Amphitrite, of Liverpool, on the coast of Africa.

In 1800, 34 British enslaving ships were lost. Three were lost outward bound, before they could acquire captives. During the period 1793 to 1807, war, rather than maritime hazards or resistance by the captives, was the greatest cause of vessel losses among British slave vessels.

Citations

References
 
 

1796 ships
Ships built in Kingston upon Hull
Age of Sail merchant ships of England
Liverpool slave ships
British slave trade
Captured ships